Chandler Regis Worthy (born September 15, 1993) is a Canadian football wide receiver for the Montreal Alouettes of the Canadian Football League (CFL). He was signed by the Houston Texans as an undrafted free agent in 2015, and has also been a member of the New York Jets. He played college football at Troy. Worthy has also been a member of the New York Jets and Toronto Argonauts.

Professional career

Houston Texans 
After going undrafted in the 2015 NFL Draft Worthy signed with the Houston Texans. Worthy played in three games for the Texans in 2015, catching three passes for 14 yards. He also returned three punts for a total of nine yards, and had one kickoff return for 27 yards.

New York Jets 
Worthy signed a reserve/future contract with the New York Jets on January 12, 2016. On September 3, 2016, he was released by the Jets as part of final roster cuts.

Toronto Argonauts 
On February 2, 2017, Worthy and the Toronto Argonauts agreed to a contract. He dressed in his first CFL game on June 25, 2017, against the Hamilton Tiger-Cats where he returned five punts for 20 yards and had five kickoff returns for 60 yards. After playing in three games, he was moved to the injured list, where he remained until the September 16, 2017, when he recorded his first career CFL reception, for five yards, against the Edmonton Eskimos. However, he was moved to the practice roster on September 20, 2017, and then outright released on October 20, 2017.

Worthy re-signed with the Argonauts on January 24, 2018, but was released during training camp on June 3, 2018. He re-signed with the Argonauts on October 10, 2018, but spent the rest of the year on the practice roster and was re-signed after the conclusion of the season.

In 2019, he began the season on the injured list and practice roster before playing in the July 25, 2019 game against Edmonton. He went back to the practice roster and then played again on October 18, 2019 where he had a career-high nine catches for 93 yards and one touchdown, which was the first of his CFL career, in a game against the Montreal Alouettes. For the season, he played in three games where he had a total of 12 receptions for 129 yards and two touchdowns.

Worthy re-signed with the Argonauts on December 2, 2019, but did not play in 2020 due to the cancellation of the 2020 CFL season. He began the 2021 season on the practice roster and was released on August 10, 2021. He re-signed with the Argonauts on September 1, 2021 to a practice roster agreement. He played in nine regular season games where he had 16 receptions for 203 yards and two touchdowns. He spent part of 2022 training camp with the team, but was released after the first pre-season game on May 29, 2022.

Montreal Alouettes 
Two days after being released by the Argos, Worthy signed with the Montreal Alouettes. He played in 15 regular season games where he had 47 punt returns for 547 yards, 51 kickoff returns for 1,220 yards and two touchdowns, and three missed field goal returns for 57 yards. At the end of the 2022 season, he was named the East Division's nominee for the CFL's Most Outstanding Special Teams Player and was named an East Division All-Star.

References

External links
Toronto Argonauts bio
Houston Texans bio
Troy Trojans bio

1993 births
Living people
People from Griffin, Georgia
Players of American football from Georgia (U.S. state)
American football wide receivers
American football return specialists
Canadian football wide receivers
American players of Canadian football
Troy Trojans football players
Houston Texans players
New York Jets players
Toronto Argonauts players
Montreal Alouettes players